SelectaVision was a trademark name used on four classes of device by RCA:
 The Holotape, a prototype video medium
 Magnetic tape
 VHS videocassette recorders, and
 Capacitance Electronic Disc videodisc players and the discs themselves.

Capacitance Electronic Disc's competitors, Philips/Magnavox and Pioneer, instead manufactured optical discs, read with lasers. On April 4, 1984, RCA, having sold only 550,000 players, ended sales, losing $580 million. The losses resulted in General Electric's acquisition of RCA in 1986, and the "SelectaVision" brand was abandoned.

See also
Video High Density (JVC, 1970)
Electronic Video Recording (CBS, 1967)
Phonovision (Baird, 1928)
Vitascan (DuMont, 1949)

References

External links
SelectaVision page on Total Rewind - the Virtual Museum of Vintage VCRs

Discontinued media formats
Video storage
RCA brands
Television technology
Trademarks
RCA